Paruroctonus is a genus of scorpions in the family Vaejovidae. There are about 10 described species in Paruroctonus.

Species
 Paruroctonus becki (Gertsch & Allred, 1965)
 Paruroctonus boreus  (northern scorpion)
 Paruroctonus conclusus (Jain & Forbes, 2022)
 Paruroctonus gracilior (Hoffmann, 1931) (Chihuahuan slender-tailed scorpion)
 Paruroctonus luteolus  (golden dwarf sand scorpion)
 Paruroctonus pecos (Sissom & Francke, 1981)
 Paruroctonus silvestrii  (California common scorpion)
 Paruroctonus soda (Jain & Forbes, 2022)
 Paruroctonus utahensis (Williams, 1968) (eastern sand scorpion)
 Paruroctonus variabilis Hjelle, 1982

References

 Ayrey R, Webber M (2013). "A new Vaejovis C.L. Koch, 1836, the second known vorhiesi group species from the Santa Catalina Mountains of Arizona (Scorpiones, Vaejovidae)". ZooKeys 270: 21-35.

Vaejovidae